The 1988 Brabantse Pijl was the 28th edition of the Brabantse Pijl cycle race and was held on 27 March 1988. The race started in Sint-Genesius-Rode and finished in Alsemberg. The race was won by Johan Capiot.

General classification

References

1988
Brabantse Pijl